{{Infobox person
| name               =  George Petrie
| image              =  Mulreninpetrie.jpg
| caption            = Portrait of George Petrie, by Bernard Mulrenin
| birth_date         =  1 January 1790
| birth_place        = 
| death_date         = 17 January 1866 
| resting_place_coordinates =  
| burial_place       =  
| burial_coordinates =  
| occupation         = Painter, Antiquarian
}}

George Petrie (1 January 1790 – 17 January 1866) was an Irish painter, musician, antiquarian and archaeologist of the Victorian era who was instrumental in building the collections of the Royal Irish Academy and National Museum of Ireland.

Personal life
George Petrie was born in Dublin, Ireland, and grew up there, living at 21 Great Charles Street, just off Mountjoy Square. He was the son of the portrait and miniature painter James Petrie, a native of Aberdeen, Scotland, who had settled in Dublin. He was interested in art from an early age. He was sent to the Dublin Society's Schools, being educated as an artist, where he won the silver medal in 1805, aged 15.

Career

After an abortive trip to England in the company of friends Francis Danby and James Arthur O'Connor, he returned to Ireland where he worked mostly producing sketches for engravings for travel books – including among others, George Newenham Wright's guides to Killarney, Wicklow and Dublin, Thomas Cromwell's Excursions through Ireland, and James Norris Brewer's Beauties of Ireland.

In the late 1820s and 1830s, Petrie significantly revitalised the Royal Irish Academy's antiquities committee. He was responsible for their acquisition of many important Irish manuscripts, including an autograph copy of the Annals of the Four Masters, as well as examples of insular metalwork, including the Cross of Cong and Roscrea Brooch. 

His writings on early Irish archaeology and architecture were of great significance, especially his essay on the Round Towers of Ireland, which appeared in his 1845 book titled The Ecclesiastical Architecture of Ireland. He is often called "the father of Irish archaeology". His survey of the tombs at Carrowmore still informs study of the site today.

From 1833 to 1843, he was employed by Thomas Colby and Thomas Larcom as head of the Topographical Department (the antiquities division) of the Irish Ordnance Survey. Amongst his staff were John O'Donovan and Eugene O'Curry. 

A prizewinning essay submitted to the Royal Irish Academy in 1834 on Irish military architecture was never published, but his seminal essay On the History and Antiquities of Tara Hill was published by the Academy in 1839. During this period Petrie was himself the editor of two popular antiquarian magazines, the Dublin Penny Journal and, later, the Irish Penny Journal. 

Another major contribution of Petrie's to Irish culture was the collection of Irish traditional airs and melodies which he published in 1855 as The Petrie Collection of the Ancient Music of Ireland.  The first commercial recording of Petrie's collection was The Petrie Collection of the Ancient Music of Ireland (the 1855 Edition of 147 Airs & the 1882 Edition of 40 Airs) [2007, 8-cd set, Trigon TRD 1526, 187 tracks] arranged and performed by Irish pianist J.J. Sheridan. William Stokes's contemporary biography includes detailed accounts of Petrie's working methods in his collecting of traditional music: "The song having been given, O'Curry wrote the Irish words, when Petrie's work began. The singer recommenced, stopping at a signal from him at every two or three bars of the melody to permit the writing of the notes, and often repeating the passage until it was correctly taken down ..."

As an artist, his favourite medium was watercolour which, due to the prejudices of the age, was considered inferior to oil painting. Nonetheless, he can be considered one of the finest Irish Romantic painters of his era. Some of his best work is in the collections of the National Gallery of Ireland, such as his watercolour painting Gougane Barra Lake with the Hermitage of St Finbarr, Co. Cork (1831).

He was awarded the Royal Irish Academy's prestigious Cunningham Medal three times: firstly in 1831 for his essay on the round towers, secondly in 1834 for the essay (now lost) on Irish military architecture, and thirdly in 1839 for his essay on the antiquities of Tara Hill.

Worksincomplete, only larger works listedMusic
 

 , uncompleted fragment published posthumously

Illustrations

Antiquarian works

Also as 
 , unpublished, won a gold medal from the Royal Irish Academy, see 

References

Sources
 Cooper, David. The Petrie Collection of the Ancient Music of Ireland. Cork University Press, 2002
 Crooke, Elizabeth. Politics, Archaeology and the Creation of a National Museum of Ireland: An Expression of National Life''. Dublin: Irish Academic Press, 2001.

External links

 Dublin University Magazine 1839
 
 , a painting engraved by J Rogers for Fisher's Drawing Room Scrap Book, 1833 with a poetical illustration by Letitia Elizabeth Landon.
 , a painting engraved by Edward Goodall for Fisher's Drawing Room Scrap Book, 1835 with a poetical illustration by Letitia Elizabeth Landon.

1790 births
1866 deaths
19th-century Irish painters
Irish male painters
George Petrie
Irish art historians
Irish antiquarians
Archaeologists from Dublin (city)
Irish musicologists
Irish people of Scottish descent
People associated with the National Museum of Ireland
Painters from Dublin (city)
19th-century Irish male artists
19th-century musicologists